The Bow River is a river in the Great Southern region of Western Australia.

The river rises on the eastern edge of the Frankland State Forest and flows in a southerly direction discharging into Irwin Inlet, which opens to the Southern Ocean at Foul Bay.

Bow River is a fresh water river with potential to be used as a water source in the area.

Forms of environmental damage have been identified at the river and its wetlands, including:
Exotic weed infestation from Watsonia, blackberry and exotic grasses
Feral animals such as pigs and foxes
Water pollution from excess fertiliser loads added by local agricultural activity
Pathogens such as Phytophthora

References

Rivers of the Great Southern region